Estadio Domingo Burgueño is a multi-use stadium in Maldonado, Uruguay.  It is used mostly for football matches.  The stadium holds 22,000 people and was built in 1994.

It hosted games during the 1995 Copa América, 1999 South American Under-17 Football Championship and 2003 South American Youth Championship, as well as the Punta Del Este Sevens rugby tournament from 1989 to 2014 and later since 2017.

It is home of Deportivo Maldonado in the Uruguayan Primera División. Also, Rocha FC and Atenas de San Carlos have played home matches at the stadium.

References

External links
World Stadium Article 
Soccerway Profile

Multi-purpose stadiums in Uruguay
Football venues in Uruguay
Copa América stadiums
Sports venues completed in 1994
Estadio Domingo Burgueño
1994 establishments in Uruguay
Estadio Domingo Burgueño
Estadio Domingo Burgueño
World Rugby Sevens Series venues
Sport in Maldonado Department